The 2023 Lamar Cardinals baseball team represents Lamar University during the 2023 NCAA Division I baseball season. The Cardinals play their home games at Vincent–Beck Stadium and are led by seventh–year head coach Will Davis. They return as members of the Southland Conference following one year as members of the Western Athletic Conference.

Previous season

The Cardinals had a regular season record of 37–21 and a conference record of 20–10 finishing in second place in the WAC Southwest division, one game behind division winner Sam Houston.  They participated in the 2022 Western Athletic Conference baseball tournament as the second seeded team from the Southwest Division.  After winning their first conference tournament game against Seattle, the Cardinals' season ended after losing to West Division first seed Grand Canyon and Southwest Division fourth seed Abilene Christian.

Preseason

New Players
On August 25, 2022, Lamar announced that twenty-nine new players would join the team for the 2023 season.

Southland Conference Coaches Poll
The Southland Conference Coaches Poll was released on February 3, 2023. Lamar was picked to finish third in the Southland Conference with 88 votes.

Preseason All-Southland team
One Lamar player was named to the conference preseason second team.

First Team
Edgar Alvarez (NICH, JR, 1st Base)
Brad Burckel  (MCNS, SR, 2nd Base)
Josh Leslie (MCNS, SR, 3rd Base)
Parker Coddou (NICH, JR, Shortstop)
Bo Willis (NWST, JR, Catcher)
Tre Jones (TAMUCC, JR, Designated Hitter)
Payton Harden (MCNS, SR, Outfielder)
Brendan Ryan (TAMUCC, SR, Outfielder)
Xane Washington (NICH, R-SR, Outfielder)
Zach Garcia  (TAMUCC, SO, Starting Pitcher)
Grant Rogers (MCNS, JR, Starting Pitcher)
Tyler Theriot (NICH, SR, Starting Pitcher)
Burrell Jones (MCNS, SR, Relief Pitcher)
Alec Carr (UIW, SR, Utility)

Second Team
Josh Blankenship (LU, SR, 1st Base)
Daunte Stuart (NWST, JR, 2nd Base)
Kasten Furr (NO, JR, 3rd Base)
Tyler Bischke (NO, JR, Shortstop)
Bryce Grizzaffi (SELA, SR, Catcher)
Kade Hunter (MCNS, SR, Designated Hitter)
Josh Caraway (TAMUCC, JR, Outfielder)
Braden Duhon (MCNS, JR, Outfielder)
Issac Williams (NO, JR, Outfielder)
Cal Carver  (NWST, SR, Starting Pitcher)
Tyler LeBlanc (NO, JR, Starting Pitcher)
Will Kinzeler (SELA, JR, Starting Pitcher)
Dalton Aspholm (SELA, SR, Relief Pitcher)
Tre’ Obregon III (MCNS, SR, Utility)

Roster

Schedule and results

References

Lamar Cardinals
Lamar Cardinals baseball seasons
Lamar Cardinals baseball